Beans On Toast is the stage name of British folk singer Jay McAllister from Braintree, Essex, England, who rose to prominence out of the UK folk scene in 2005. His songs often centre around the topics of politics, drugs and love. Beans On Toast has released fifteen studio albums, traditionally releasing a new record each year on 1 December, McAllister's birthday.

Career
Jay McAllister was born on 1 December 1980. He began his career as the vocalist of alternative rock band Jellicoe, embarking on a solo career in 2005 following the band's split.

Beans On Toast has performed at the Glastonbury Festival every year since 2007. He supported Kate Nash at London's Hammersmith Apollo in 2008, before releasing his debut 50-track double album Standing On A Chair in 2009. Produced by Ben Lovett of Mumford & Sons, it featured guest vocals by Emmy The Great, Frank Turner and members of The Holloways, amongst others.

Along with Ian Grimble, Beans On Toast produced 2010 follow-up Writing on the Wall. Both albums were well-received and gained positive reviews in the Sunday Times and the Mirror, alongside airplay on 6Music, Xfm, and Radio 1 and 2. Later in the year, Beans On Toast played in the Westway Round the UK Tour, the first national tour by Strummerville bands.

Beans On Toast's third album, Trying to tell the Truth, was released in 2011 and produced by Frank Turner, with Beans On Toast going on to be the support act for Turner's sold out Wembley Arena show in April 2012.

A fourth studio album, Fishing for a Thank You, was released in 2012 with production work by Lee Smith and Jamie Lockhart. During this period, Beans On Toast also headlined a sold-out Scala show in Kings Cross, London, which was captured and released as the Live at Scala album in 2013. His fifth album, Giving Everything, was released on 1 December 2013, and made it into the top ten of the iTunes Singer-Songwriter Chart.

In 2014, Beans On Toast performed to a crowd of over 100,000 in one week while opening Frank Turner's UK stadium tour. In the same year, he embarked upon his first American tour, playing headline shows as well as several dates with Irish-American punk band Flogging Molly. A limited edition 10" was released in the UK entitled Best of Toast Pressed on a Vinyl for Record Store Day 2014 in April. This led to a sixth studio album, The Grand Scheme of Things, followed by a UK tour.

Throughout 2015, Beans On Toast toured the UK and US, as well as playing one-off shows in the Netherlands, Germany, and South America. He kicked off the year touring America before returning to the UK for an "Off the Road" tour, visiting smaller venues in the UK. Beans On Toast also toured during the festival season, appearing at YNOT Festival, Boomtown, and the Glastonbury Festival, amongst others. In mid-September, he followed long-time friend and producer Frank Turner on his headline tour of America. In December 2015, Beans On Toast released a seventh album, Rolling Up A Hill, recorded in Kansas with Truckstop Honeymoon.

In 2016, Beans On Toast again completed his usual touring schedule, including North America, two UK tours, and a number of other shows worldwide. On his main UK tour in November and December, he had two main support acts, SkySmeed, an American country singer and Tensheds, a piano bashing duo. On 1 December, he released his eighth album A Spanner in the Works which was recorded over one weekend on a laptop, straying away from a typical Beans On Toast album with no guitar being used, except on the track "2016", one of the singles from the album.

On 1 December 2017, Beans On Toast released his ninth studio album Cushty, followed in 2018 by his first book Drunk Folk Stories, a collection of ten, short, true-life stories about songwriting, travelling and drinking.

2018's A Bird in the Hand was Beans' tenth studio album, produced by Ben Lovett in London's Church Studios. The album focuses heavily on the birth of his newborn daughter, tackling family, love and the world on your front doorstep.

On 31 July 2019, Beans announced his 11th studio album, The Inevitable Train Wreck, along with a US tour starting 5 November, and a UK tour starting 4 December. The first two singles from the album, "World Gone Crazy" and "England, I Love You", were released on 10 and 31 October respectively.

Beans has released 4 singles in 2020, focused on and around the COVID-19 pandemic, called "Strange Days", "Human Contact", "Chessington World Of Adventures" and "Glastonbury Weekend".

Discography

Studio albums
 Standing on a Chair (1 December 2009)
 Writing on the Wall (1 December 2010)
 Trying To Tell The Truth (1 December 2011)
 Fishing for a Thank You (1 December 2012)
 Giving Everything (1 December 2013)
 The Grand Scheme Of Things (1 December 2014)
 Rolling Up The Hill (1 December 2015)
 A Spanner in the Works (1 December 2016)
 Cushty (1 December 2017)
 A Bird in the Hand (1 December 2018)
 The Inevitable Train Wreck (1 December 2019)
 Knee Deep in Nostalgia (1 December 2020)
 The Unforseeable Future (1 December 2020)
 Survival of the Friendliest (1 December 2021)
 The Fascinating Adventures of Little Bee (1 December 2022)

Compilations
 Rock Against Malaria (2009) Eunuch Records
 Live at Scala (25 September 2013)
 Best of Toast Pressed on Vinyl (19 April 2014)

One off collaborations
 This Christmas (December 2015) with Skinny Lister

References

External links

1980 births
Living people
People from Braintree, Essex
English male singer-songwriters
English folk singers
21st-century English singers
21st-century British male singers